Dagmar Mair unter der Eggen (born 22 December 1974) is an Italian snowboarder.

She was born in Bruneck. She competed at the 1998 Winter Olympics, in giant slalom. Her achievements at the World Championships include a gold medal in the parallel slalom in 1997, and a bronze medal in giant slalom in 2001.

References

External links 
 

1974 births
Living people
Sportspeople from Bruneck
Italian female snowboarders
Olympic snowboarders of Italy
Snowboarders at the 1998 Winter Olympics
Snowboarders at the 2002 Winter Olympics